The Slave Market is an 1866 painting by the French artist Jean-Léon Gérôme. It depicts an unspecific Middle Eastern or North African setting where a man inspects the teeth of a nude, female slave.

The painting was bought by Adolphe Goupil on 23 August 1866 and exhibited at the Salon in 1867. It was bought and sold several times until Robert Sterling Clark bought it in 1930. Since 1955 it is part of the Clark Art Institute's collection.

Along with Gérôme's The Snake Charmer (also owned by the Clark), The Slave Market has become an iconic example of 19th-century orientalist art.

Reception
Maxime Du Camp, who had travelled extensively in the Near East, reviewed the painting from the 1867 Salon. He located the motif to Cairo's slave market and described the painting as "a scene done on the spot". Du Camp wrote:
It is one of these [more expensive] women, an Abyssinian, that M. Gérôme has taken as the principal figure of his composition. She is nude and being displayed by the djellab, who has the fine head of a brigand accustomed to every sort of abduction and violence; the idea of the eternal soul must not very often have tormented such a bandit. The poor girl is standing, submissive, humble, resigned, with a fatalistic passivity that the painter has very skillfully rendered.

Race, gender, and sexuality 
In an art historical context, Harem scenes depicted domestic spaces for the women in the Muslim societies; the males were only included in barbaric and sexual relations. This painting presents an unspecific Middle Eastern or North African setting in which a man inspects the teeth of a nude Caucasian female slave. Women were depicted with a passive sexuality, while the men were depicted as domineering and disrespectful towards women.

Gérome's depictions of slave trading predated The Slave Market and some were set in the Classical world. He painted a very similar scene in 1857, Buying a Slave, set in the ancient Greek or Roman world, in which racial differences between buyer, seller, and slave are not as apparent. The slaves depicted sometimes vary in skin color (as in The Slave Market of 1871); in all cases a woman or women are for sale, with men as buyers or sellers, but in the background of The Slave Market buyers can be seen inspecting a nude, dark-skinned male, and in the background of Slave Market in Ancient Rome (c. 1884) two enslaved males, one black and one white, can be seen.

A depiction by Gérôme of a slave in another context is Cave Canem (1881). In ancient Rome, a chained and collared man sits under the notice "Cave Canem," Latin for "Beware the Dog."

Use in media

2019 European elections
The right-wing political party Alternative for Germany used the painting in a political advert for the 2019 European Parliament election. The reprint was accompanied with the slogan "Europeans vote AfD!" and "So Europe doesn't become Eurabia!" Deutsche Welle reported how the painting was used with racist intent, in that it suggestively depicted dark-skinned men with beards and turbans "inspecting the teeth of a nude white woman". The Clark Art Institute denounced AfD's use of the painting strongly.

Gallery: Gérôme's depictions of slaves and slave markets

Gallery: Other Academic and Orientalist depictions of slave markets

References

External links
The Slave Market  at the Clark Art Institute's website
Jean-Léon Gérôme: Slave Market by Sarah Lees from Nineteenth-century European Paintings at the Sterling and Francine Clark Art Institute, pp. 359–363.

1866 paintings
Eurabia
Paintings by Jean-Léon Gérôme
Paintings in Massachusetts
Slavery in art
Nude art